Tougaloo College is a private historically black college in the Tougaloo area of Jackson, Mississippi. It is affiliated with the United Church of Christ and Christian Church (Disciples of Christ). It was originally established in 1869 by New York–based Christian missionaries for the education of freed slaves and their offspring. From 1871 until 1892 the college served as a teachers' training school funded by the state of Mississippi. In 1998, the buildings of the old campus were added to the National Register of Historic Places.

Tougaloo College has a rich history of civic and social activism, including the Tougaloo Nine.

History

Establishment
In 1869, the American Missionary Association of New York purchased  of one of the largest former plantations in central Mississippi to build a college for freedmen and their children, recently freed slaves. The purchase included a standing mansion and outbuildings, which were immediately converted for use as a school. The next year expansion of facilities began in earnest with the construction of two new buildings — Washington Hall, a 70-foot-long edifice containing classrooms and a lecture hall, and Boarding Hall, a two-story building which included a kitchen and dining hall, a laundry, and dormitories for 30 female students.

Costs of construction were paid by the United States government through the education department of its Bureau of Refugees and Freedmen. Additional funds, totaling $25,500 in all, were provided for development of the school farm, including monies for farm implements and livestock.

In 1871, the Mississippi State Legislature granted the new institution a formal charter under the name of Tougaloo University. No contingency fund was provided for the day-to-day operation of the school, with some students paying a tuition of $1 per month while others attended tuition free, contributing labor on the school farm in lieu of fees. The cost of two teachers at the school for five months were paid by the county boards of education of Hinds and Madison Counties; all additional operating funds were provided by the American Missionary Association.

In its initial incarnation, Tougaloo University was not a university in the modern sense of the term, instead serving as an institution which provided basic education of black students born under slavery along with the training of capable African-American students for service as teachers. At the end of 1871, the school included 94 "elementary students", 47 that were part of the "normal school", and 1 categorized as "academic" — a total student body of 142. At this time the school found itself in dire need of expanded facilities and operational funds and an appeal was made by three leaders of Tougaloo University to the Mississippi Superintendent of Public Education for a state role in the institution. Legislation followed authorizing the establishment of a State Normal School on the grounds of Tougaloo and providing a total of $4,000 for two years to help provide teachers' salaries, student aid, and for the purchase of desks.

As part of the establishment of the Normal School at Tougaloo, each county in the state was provided with two free scholarships, and every student declaring an intention to teach in Mississippi's common schools was to be allotted a stipend of 50 cents per week out of the state funds for student aid, an amount capped at $1,000 per year.

In 1873, Tougaloo University added a theological department for students intending on entering the Christian ministry and expanded its industrial department, adding a cotton gin, apparatus for grinding corn, and developing capacity for the manufacture of simple furniture on site.

On January 23, 1881, Washington Hall — the main classroom building — caught fire during religious services and was entirely destroyed. For the rest of the academic year, classes were conducted in a new barn recently constructed on campus, nicknamed "Ayrshire Hall". In the spring, a brickyard was established on campus and on May 31, 1881, the foundation was laid for a new classroom building, a three-storey facility named Strieby Hall after Reverend M.E. Strieby of New York, a venerated leader of the American Missionary Association.

Courses for college credit were first offered in 1897, and the first Bachelor of Arts degree was awarded in 1901.

In 1916, the name of the institution was changed to Tougaloo College.

Return to private status
Tougaloo remained predominantly a teacher training school until 1920 when the college ceased receiving aid from the state.

Mergers
Six years after Tougaloo's founding, the Home Missionary Society of the Christian Church (Disciples of Christ) obtained a charter from the Mississippi State Legislature to establish a school at Edwards, Mississippi, to be known as Southern Christian Institute. That same year, Sarah Ann Dickey, who had worked with the American Missionary Association since the 1860s, established the Mount Hermon Female Seminary, which would later merge with Tougaloo in 1924, as the two schools had similar ideals and goals. Similarly, the Southern Christian Institute would merge with Tougaloo in 1954.

The new college combined the resources of the two supporting bodies and renewed its dedication to educational advancement and the improvement of race relations in Mississippi. The alumni bodies of the two institutions united to become the National Alumni Association of Tougaloo Southern Christian College. In 1962, by vote of the board of trustees, and with the agreement of the supporting bodies, the school's name was returned to its last before the 1954 merger, Tougaloo College.

Recent history
Carmen J. Walters, the fourteenth president (and second female president), began her tenure July 1, 2019. In 2020, Tougaloo received $6 million from philanthropist MacKenzie Scott. It is the largest gift from a single donor in Tougaloo's history.

Campus
The campus is in Jackson, and in Madison County. The campus includes a Historic District, which comprises ten buildings that are each listed on the National Register of Historic Places. The Robert O. Wilder Building, built in 1860 and also known as "The Mansion" overlooks the ensemble of buildings forming the college's historic core.

Woodworth Chapel, originally known as Woodworth Church, was built in 1901 by students. It was restored and rededicated in 2002. In September 2004, the National Trust for Historic Preservation awarded Tougaloo College the National Preservation Honor Award for the restoration of Woodworth Chapel. The restoration was also recognized by the Mississippi Chapter of the American Institute of Architects, who bestowed its Honor Award. Woodworth Chapel houses the Union Church, founded alongside the college as a Congregational Church. Today, it is one of two congregations of the United Church of Christ in Mississippi. Located in the heart of the campus beside Woodworth Chapel is Brownlee Gymnasium. Built in 1947, the building was named in honor of Fred L. Brownlee, former general secretary of the American Missionary Association.

The college holds the prestigious Tougaloo Art Collection. It was begun in 1963, by a group of prominent New York artists, curators and critics, initiated by the late Ronald Schnell, Professor Emeritus of Art, as a mechanism to motivate his art students. The collection consists of pieces by African American, American and European artists. Included in the African-American portion of the collection are pieces by notable artists Jacob Lawrence, Romare Bearden, David Driskell, Richard Hunt, Elizabeth Catlett and Hale Woodruff. The 1,150 works in the Tougaloo Art Collection include paintings, sculptures, drawings, collages, various forms of graphic art and ornamental pieces.

The Tougaloo Art Colony is another distinctive resource of the college. Begun in 1997 under the leadership of former College trustee, Jane Hearn, the Tougaloo Art Colony affords its participants exposure to and intensive instruction by artists. The Civil Rights Library and Archives are a part of Tougaloo College. Among their holdings are the original papers, photographs and memorabilia of movement leaders including Fannie Lou Hamer, Medgar Evers and Martin Luther King Jr. It contains the works of blues musician B.B. King.

The college established the Medgar Evers Museum in 1996. The Evers family (trustee Myrlie Evers-Williams and her children with Medgar) donated their home to Tougaloo College for its historical significance. In 1996, the home was restored to its condition at the time of Mr. Evers' assassination in the driveway. It is operated as a house museum and is open to the public. In 2020, the home was acquired by the National Park Service and designated a national monument.

Academics
According to the Tougaloo College website, the college has "historically produced over 40% of the African American physicians and dentists practicing in the state of Mississippi, more than one-third of the state's African American attorneys and educators including teachers, principals, school superintendents, college/university faculty and administrators."

In the 2022,U.S. News & World Report college and university rankings, Tougaloo College ranked #15 among historically black colleges and universities.

Tougaloo College is accredited by the Southern Association of Colleges and Schools (SACS); the college was initially accredited by SACS in 1953. Tougaloo College was previously on probationary status; it was removed from probation in 2012 and is currently in good standing with SACS.

Athletics
The Tougaloo athletic teams are called the Bulldogs. The college is a member of the National Association of Intercollegiate Athletics (NAIA), primarily competing in the Gulf Coast Athletic Conference (GCAC) since the 1981–82 academic year.

Tougaloo competes in 11 intercollegiate varsity sports: Men's sports include baseball, basketball, cross country, soccer and tennis; women's sports include basketball, competitive cheer, cross country, soccer, tennis and volleyball.

Notable people

Faculty
Adam Daniel Beittel, (1898-1988) president of Tougaloo College from 1960-1964
 Ernst Borinski (1901-1983), sociologist and intellectual
 L. Zenobia Coleman (1898 – 1999), librarian
 James W. Loewen, author.
 John U. Monro (1912 – 2002), director of the writing center

Alumni

References

External links 

 Official website
 Official athletics website
 Who Speaks for the Negro Vanderbilt University documentary website

Historically black universities and colleges in the United States
Universities and colleges affiliated with the United Church of Christ
Liberal arts colleges in Mississippi
Universities and colleges in the Jackson metropolitan area, Mississippi
Educational institutions established in 1869
Universities and colleges accredited by the Southern Association of Colleges and Schools
Schools in Madison County, Mississippi
Schools in Jackson, Mississippi
American Missionary Association
1869 establishments in Mississippi
Historic districts on the National Register of Historic Places in Mississippi
National Register of Historic Places in Hinds County, Mississippi
Schools supported by the Freedmen's Bureau
Private universities and colleges in Mississippi